William of Saint-Cloud is a French astronomer in the late thirteenth century.
He is known for his Almanac prepared around 1292, dedicated to Marie of Brabant, and translated for Joan of Navarre. This almanac, one of the rare witness of astronomical observations at the end of the High Middle Ages, contains ephemeris of the sun, moon and planets and advocates also the use of the camera obscura to observe solar eclipses.

References
 Biography 
 William of Saint-Cloud Almanac Planetarum, Cahiers de l'Institut du Moyen-Âge grec et Latin, N° 83 2014

13th-century births
14th-century deaths
Medieval French astronomers
13th-century astronomers